This article refers to transportation in the country of Togo.

Railways 

total:
568 km (2008)
narrow gauge:
568 km of  gauge

Roadways
total:
7,520 km
paved:
2,376 km
unpaved:
5,144 km (2000)

The Trans–West African Coastal Highway crosses Togo, connecting it to Benin and Nigeria to the east, and Ghana and Ivory Coast to the west. When construction in Liberia and Sierra Leone is finished, the highway will continue west to seven other Economic Community of West African States (ECOWAS) nations. A paved highway also connects Togo northwards to Burkina Faso and from there north-west to Mali and north-east to Niger.

Waterways 
50 km (seasonally navigable by small craft on the Mono River depending on rainfall. (2011))

Ports and harbours 
 Kpémé
 Lomé - railhead

Merchant marine 
total:
62 ships 
ships by type:
bulk carrier 6, cargo 38, carrier 3, chemical tanker 5, container 3, passenger/cargo 1, petroleum tanker 3, refrigerated cargo 1, roll on/roll off 1 (2010)

Airports 

8 (2012)

Airports - with paved runways 
total:
2
2,438 to 3,047 m:
2 (2012)
 Lomé-Tokoin Airport
 Niamtougou International Airport

Airports - with unpaved runways 
total:
6
914 to 1,523 m:
4
under 914 m:
2 (2012)

References